The Villa Philmonte is a large ranch home located outside of Cimarron, New Mexico, on Philmont Scout Ranch, owned by the Boy Scouts of America.  It was listed on the National Register of Historic Places in 1995 as part of Villa Philmonte Historic District, which included two contributing buildings, two contributing structures, and two contributing sites.  Those resources are the Villa Philmonte,  an associated guesthouse, two courtyards, and a pool, pergola and pond.

Background
The Villa was built in 1926 by oil magnate Waite Phillips who used it to oversee his  cattle ranch in northeast New Mexico. Although it is popularly considered to have been built in a Mission and Spanish Colonial due to its location in the American Southwest and external similarities to adobe structures, the decor and actual construction of the house was actually intended to be representative of the Mediterranean style; the house is actually coated by layers of plaster over the years giving it an adobe-like appearance. Phillips named the house by combining the first half of his name with monte, the Spanish word for mountain. In addition to the Villa, Phillips built several other retreats on his ranch's property, including Fish Camp on the Agua Fria Creek and Hunting Lodge near Cimarroncito (now Philmont Scout Ranch camps).

The Boy Scouts of America has operated the property since that time and has opened the Villa to Scouts and visitors as a museum. Regularly scheduled tours are offered during the summer.

Furnishings
The Villa is lavishly furnished, and retains many of Phillips’ original furnishings and collections, including particularly notable displays of antiques and weapons. The building features a large courtyard with a fountain in the center, large columns, and numerous porticoes. The interior was decorated using an eclectic mix of European, American, and Southwestern furnishings. The grand piano in the entrance is worth an estimated $200,000.

A small window on the second floor that looks towards the ranch was added to the house by Phillips after construction was completed. He wanted the window added so he could view a large rock formation on a nearby mountain.  The rock was subsequently named Window Rock.

A display window on the stairs between the first and second floor shows a landscape of saguaro cacti and a wagon being pulled by horses. In fact, wagons on the Santa Fe Trail were pulled by oxen, and there are no saguaro cacti in New Mexico.

See also

National Register of Historic Places listings in Colfax County, New Mexico

References

External links

Official Philmont Site about Villa Philmonte
Home & Garden TV on the Villa
Unofficial Philmont Web Page
Pictures of the Villa
 Voices of Oklahoma interview with Elliot "Chope" and Virginia Phillips. First person interview conducted on May 5, 2009 with Elliot "Chope" and Virginia Phillips, son and daughter-in-law of Waite Phillips. Original audio and transcript archived with Voices of Oklahoma oral history project.

Mission Revival architecture in New Mexico
Philmont Scout Ranch
Ranches on the National Register of Historic Places in New Mexico
Historic house museums in New Mexico
Museums in Colfax County, New Mexico
Biographical museums in New Mexico
Scouting museums in the United States
Houses completed in 1926
Historic districts on the National Register of Historic Places in New Mexico
National Register of Historic Places in Colfax County, New Mexico